The Luverne Historic District is a  historic district in Luverne, Alabama.  It was listed on the National Register of Historic Places in 2005.  It then included 161 contributing buildings.

The district is roughly bounded by 1st St., 6th St., and by Legrande, Glenwood, Folmar and Hawkins Avenues.

It includes works by architects Earl G. Lutz and Algernon Blair.  It includes Queen Anne and Bungalow/craftsman architecture.

It includes the Crenshaw County Courthouse, on East Third Street, built in 1972, as a non-contributing resource.

References

External links

Historic districts on the National Register of Historic Places in Alabama
Queen Anne architecture in Alabama
Crenshaw County, Alabama